Raised on Country Music is the eighth studio album by Canadian country music group Family Brown. It was released in 1982 by RCA Records and includes the singles, "Some Never Stand a Chance," "Raised on Country Music," and "Memorized by Heart," which all charted on the RPM Country Tracks chart in Canada. The album won the award for Album of the Year at the 1982 and 1983 Canadian Country Music Association Awards.

Track listing
All songs written by Barry Brown  except where noted.

References

1982 albums
Family Brown albums
RCA Records albums
Canadian Country Music Association Album of the Year albums